The 2016–17 SSV Jahn Regensburg season was the club's seventh season in the 3. Liga.

Events
SSV Jahn Regensburg won promotion after beating VfL Wolfsburg II in the 2015–16 Regionalliga promotion play-offs.

In the preseason match against FC Sopron on 16 July Ali Odabas sustained an anterior cruciate ligament injury which means he will not be able to play in the next eight or nine months.

Transfers

In

Out

Preseason and friendlies

3. Liga

3. Liga fixtures & results

Promotion play-off results 
On 20 May 2016, Jahn Regensburg qualified for the promotion play-off. Regensburg won the relegation 3–1 on aggregate and was promoted to the 2. Bundesliga.

League table

DFB-Pokal

Bavarian Cup

Bavarian Cup review

Bavarian Cup results

Player information
.

|}

Notes
A.   Kickoff time in Central European Time/Central European Summer Time.
B.   SSV Jahn Regensburg goals first.

References

SSV Jahn Regensburg seasons
Jahn Regensburg